I'm a Believer and Other Hits is a budget-priced Monkees compilation released in 1997. It contains 10 of The Monkees' greatest hits. Many tracks are in their stereo single mixes; thus, "A Little Bit Me, A Little Bit You" is without handclaps, and "Listen to the Band" has a shorter organ bridge. The album includes one track from the 1980s reunion, along with one previously unreleased track "Ceiling in My Room", taken from The Birds, The Bees & The Monkees sessions.

Track listing

"I'm a Believer" (Neil Diamond) - 2:47
"The Girl I Knew Somewhere" (Michael Nesmith) - 2:39
"Shades of Gray" (Barry Mann, Cynthia Weil) - 3:24 (Mis-credited to Goffin and King)
"Cuddly Toy" (Harry Nilsson) - 2:41 (Mis-credited to Boyce and Hart)
"A Little Bit Me, a Little Bit You" (Diamond) - 2:53
"Heart and Soul" (Simon Byrne, Andrew Howell) - 3:45
"Someday Man" (Roger Nichols, Paul Williams) - 2:41
"Ceiling in My Room" (Dominick DeMieri, Robert Dick, Davy Jones) - 3:13
"Listen to the Band" (Nesmith) - 2:29
"(I'm Not Your) Steppin' Stone" (Tommy Boyce, Bobby Hart) - 2:21

References

1997 greatest hits albums
The Monkees compilation albums
Rhino Records compilation albums